Indu Menon (b. 13 June 1980 ) is an Indian novelist and short story writer.

Early life 

Indu married Malayalam film director and poet Rupesh Paul. Rupesh and Indu have a daughter Gowri Maria and a son Adithya.

Awards and honours 
 2003: Janapriya Puraskaram - The Lesbian Cow
 2004: EP sushama Endowment - Yoshithayurakkangal

Bibliography

Novels
 Kappalinekkurichoru Vichithrapusthakam (2015)
 Janafress Oru Kodiya Kamukan(2021)

Collections of short stories
 The Lesbian Cow (2002)
 Sangh parivar (2005)
 Hinduchayayulla Muslim Purushan (2007)
 Chumbanasabda thaaravali(2013)
 Indumenonte Kathakal (2013) 
 Pazharasaththottam (2017)
 Lesbian Cow and Other Stories (2021) in English by Eka Westland. Translated by K. Nadakumar

Memoirs

 Enne Chumbikkan Padippicha sthreeye(2014)
 Ente thene ente aanandame  (2014)

Translations

 The Lesbian Cow (2002) 
 Avar Chaayam thekkaatha Chavittu Padikalilirunnu Cholam Thinnumpol (2003)
 Anuragaththinte Pusthakam (2007)
 Nammute Raktham(2021) (Tribal Poetry)

Edited work

 Bhoomiyile  Penkuttikalkk (2005)
 Thanath Bhakshanavum Jeevanopadhiyum (2019)
 Unwritten Histories and Tribal Freedom Fighters (2020)

References

External links 

 Blogger profile
 Interview with Menon at DC Books (in Malayalam)

1980 births
Living people
Writers from Kozhikode
Indian bloggers
Indian women bloggers
Indian women short story writers
Indian memoirists
21st-century Indian short story writers
21st-century Indian women writers
Women writers from Kerala
Malayalam novelists
Women memoirists
21st-century memoirists
Recipients of the Sahitya Akademi Yuva Puraskar